The Yap Trench, also known as the West Caroline Trench, is an oceanic trench near Yap Island in the western Pacific Ocean. The trench is roughly J-shaped and is 650 kilometres (400 mi) long and 8,527 metres (27,976 ft) deep at its deepest point. The trench is located on the southeastern edge of the Philippine Sea Plate and forms the part of the Pacific Ring of Fire between the Palau Islands and the Mariana Trench.

Researchers believe that the Yap Trench was formed during a classic intraoceanic subduction event, and that the trench is an example of early subduction zone development in the western Pacific. Studies are ongoing as to whether the trench is active. The Caroline Ridge collided with the Yap Trench at one point, effectively dividing the trench's tectonic evolution into two parts. Sato et al. observed in 1997 that microseismic activity in the trench was similar to that of active subduction zones, and Nagihara et al. noted large amounts of negative gravity along the trench, suggesting that a force was being exerted upon the crust beneath it.

References

Oceanic trenches of the Pacific Ocean
Subduction zones